Xenon hexafluororhodate (XeRhF6) is a deep-red noble gas compound first synthesised in 1963 by Neil Bartlett. It is analogous to xenon hexafluoroplatinate.

Synthesis

Xenon hexafluororhodate is produced by the direct combination of xenon and rhodium hexafluoride:

Xe + RhF6 → XeRhF6

References

Xenon compounds
Rhodium compounds
Fluorides
Fluorometallates